Senegambia, also known in Dutch as Bovenkust ("Upper Coast"), was the collective noun for the fortifications and trading posts owned by the Dutch West India Company (DWIC) in the region now known as Senegal. The main purpose of these trading posts was to obtain slaves in order to ship them to the Americas. The government of the territory was based on Gorée. In 1677, the Dutch lost this island to France. The next year, the French also conquered all DWIC trading posts on the Senegalese coast as well as the island of Arguin.

Having lost almost all the trade in gum arabic, bezoar stone, ambergris and ostrich feathers, the DWIC wanted to regain its position. The Frenchman Jean du Casse, head of the Compagnie de Sénégal, reached an agreement with the local leaders, who decided to destroy the Dutch trading posts and the DWIC lost its position for good.

Senegambia possessions of the DWIC 

 Gorée: 1617 to 1663 and 1664 to 1677.
 on Goreé were two fortifications: Fort Nassau (near Fort St. Francois) to the north part of the island and Fort Orange (near Fort St. Michel) on the south end of the island.

Trading posts:
 Portudal: 1633 to 1678. Here the DWIC bought slaves and ivory.
 Rufisque: 1633 to 1678.
 Joal: 1633 to 1678.

Senegambia
Dutch colonisation in Africa
Dutch West India Company
Former colonies in Africa
Former Dutch colonies
History of Senegal
History of West Africa
West African countries
1617 establishments in Africa
1670s disestablishments in Africa
1617 establishments in the Dutch Empire
1678 disestablishments in the Dutch Empire